A satellite system is a set of gravitationally bound objects in orbit around a planetary mass object (incl. sub-brown dwarfs and rogue planets) or minor planet, or its barycenter. Generally speaking, it is a set of natural satellites (moons), although such systems may also consist of bodies such as circumplanetary disks, ring systems, moonlets, minor-planet moons and artificial satellites any of which may themselves have satellite systems of their own (see Subsatellites). Some bodies also possess quasi-satellites that have orbits gravitationally influenced by their primary, but are generally not considered to be part of a satellite system. Satellite systems can have complex interactions including magnetic, tidal, atmospheric and orbital interactions such as orbital resonances and libration.  Individually major satellite objects are designated in Roman numerals.  Satellite systems are referred to either by the possessive adjectives of their primary (e.g. "Jovian system"), or less commonly by the name of their primary (e.g. "Jupiter system").  Where only one satellite is known, or it is a binary with a common centre of gravity, it may be referred to using the hyphenated names of the primary and major satellite (e.g. the "Earth-Moon system").

Many Solar System objects are known to possess satellite systems, though their origin is still unclear.  Notable examples include the largest satellite system, the Jovian system, with 95 known moons (including the large Galilean moons)  and the Saturnian System with 83 known moons (and the most visible ring system in the Solar System).  Both satellite systems are large and diverse.  In fact all of the giant planets of the Solar System possess large satellite systems as well as planetary rings, and it is inferred that this is a general pattern.  Several objects farther from the Sun also have satellite systems consisting of multiple moons, including the complex Plutonian system where multiple objects orbit a common center of mass, as well as many asteroids and plutinos.  Apart from the Earth-Moon system and Mars' system of two tiny natural satellites, the other terrestrial planets are generally not considered satellite systems, although some have been orbited by artificial satellites originating from Earth.

Little is known of satellite systems beyond the Solar System, although it is inferred that natural satellites are common. J1407b is an example of an extrasolar satellite system. It is also theorised that Rogue planets ejected from their planetary system could retain a system of satellites.

Natural formation and evolution
Satellite systems, like planetary systems, are the product of gravitational attraction, but are also sustained through fictitious forces.  While the general consensus is that most planetary systems are formed from an accretionary disks, the formation of satellite systems is less clear.  The origin of many moons are investigated on a case-by-case basis, and the larger systems are thought to have formed through a combination of one or more processes.

System stability

The Hill sphere is the region in which an astronomical body dominates the attraction of satellites. Of the Solar System planets, Neptune and Uranus have the largest Hill spheres, due to the lessened gravitational influence of the Sun at their far orbits, however all of the giant planets have Hill spheres in the vicinity of 100 million kilometres in radius. By contrast, the Hill spheres of Mercury and Ceres, being closer to the Sun are quite small.  Outside of the Hill sphere, the Sun dominates the gravitational influence, with the exception of the Lagrangian points.

These lie at the third corners of the two equilateral triangles in the plane of orbit whose common base is the line between the centers of the two masses, such that the point lies behind or ahead of the smaller mass with regard to its orbit around the larger mass. The triangular points ( and ) are stable equilibria, provided that the ratio of M1/M2 is nearly 24.96. When a body at these points is perturbed, it moves away from the point, but the factor opposite of that which is increased or decreased by the perturbation (either gravity or angular momentum-induced speed) will also increase or decrease, bending the object's path into a stable, kidney-bean-shaped orbit around the point (as seen in the corotating frame of reference).

It is generally thought that natural satellites should orbit in the same direction as the planet is rotating (known as prograde orbit).  As such, the terminology regular moon is used for these orbit.  However a retrograde orbit (the opposite direction to the planet) is also possible, the terminology irregular moon is used to describe known exceptions to the rule, it is believed that irregular moons have been inserted into orbit through gravitational capture.

Accretion theories
Accretion disks around giant planets may occur in a similar way to the occurrence of disks around stars, out of which planets form (for example, this is one of the theories for the formations of the satellite systems of Uranus, Saturn, and Jupiter). This early cloud of gas is a type of circumplanetary disk known as a proto-satellite disk (in the case of the Earth-Moon system, the proto-lunar disk). Models of gas during the formation of planets coincide with a general rule for planet-to-satellite(s) mass ratio of 10,000:1 (a notable exception is Neptune).  Accretion is also proposed by some as a theory for the origin of the Earth-Moon system, however the angular momentum of system and the Moon's smaller iron core can not easily be explained by this.

Debris disks
Another proposed mechanism for satellite system formation is accretion from debris.  Scientists theorise that the Galilean moons are thought by some to be a more recent generation of moons formed from the disintegration of earlier generations of accreted moons.  Ring systems are a type of circumplanetary disk that can be the result of satellites disintegrated near the Roche limit.  Such disks could, over time, coalesce to form natural satellites.

Collision theories

Collision is one of the leading theories for the formation of satellite systems, particularly those of the Earth and Pluto. Objects in such a system may be part of a collisional family and this origin may be verified comparing their orbital elements and composition.  Computer simulations have been used to demonstrate that giant impacts could have been the origin of the Moon.  It is thought that early Earth had multiple moons resulting from the giant impact. Similar models have been used to explain the creation of the Plutonian system as well as those of other Kuiper belt objects and asteroids.  This is also a prevailing theory for the origin of the moons of Mars. Both sets of findings support an origin of Phobos from material ejected by an impact on Mars that reaccreted in Martian orbit. Collision is also used to explain peculiarities in the Uranian system.
Models developed in 2018 explain the planet's unusual spin support an oblique collision with an object twice the size of Earth which likely to have re-coalesced to form the system's icy moons.

Gravitational capture theories

Some theories suggest that gravitational capture is the origin of Neptune's major moon Triton, the moons of Mars, and Saturn's moon Phoebe.  Some scientists have put forward extended atmospheres around young planets as a mechanism for slowing the movement of a passing objects to aid in capture.  The hypothesis has been put forward to explain the irregular satellite orbits of Jupiter and Saturn, for example. A tell-tale sign of capture is a retrograde orbit, which can result from an object approaching the side of the planet which it is rotating towards.  Capture has even been proposed as the origin of Earth's Moon. In the case of the latter, however, virtually identical isotope ratios found in samples of the Earth and Moon cannot be explained easily by this theory.

Temporary capture
Evidence for the natural process of satellite capture has been found in direct observation of objects captured by Jupiter.  Five such captures have been observed, the longest being for approximately twelve years. Based on computer modelling, the future capture of comet 111P/Helin-Roman-Crockett for 18 years is predicted to begin in 2068. However temporary captured orbits have highly irregular and unstable, the theorised processes behind stable capture may be exceptionally rare.

Controversial theories
Some controversial early theories, for example Spaceship Moon Theory and Shklovsky's "Hollow Phobos" hypothesis have suggested that moons were not formed naturally at all. These theories tend to fail Occam's razor. While artificial satellites are now a common occurrence in the Solar System, the largest, the International Space Station is 108.5 metres at its widest, is tiny compared to the several kilometres of the smallest natural satellites.

Notable satellite systems

Known satellite systems of the Solar System consisting of multiple objects or around planetary mass objects, in order of perihelion:

Planetary Mass

Small Solar System body

Features and interactions
Natural satellite systems, particularly those involving multiple planetary mass objects can have complex interactions which can have effects on multiple bodies or across the wider system.

Ring systems

Ring systems are collections of dust, moonlets, or other small objects. The most notable examples are those around Saturn, but the other three gas giants (Jupiter, Uranus and Neptune) also have ring systems. Studies of exoplanets indicate that they may be common around giant planets. The 90 million km (0.6 AU) circumplanetary ring system discovered around J1407b has been described as "Saturn on steroids" or “Super Saturn” Luminosity studies suggest that an even larger disk exists in the PDS 110 system.

Other objects have also been found to possess rings. Haumea was the first dwarf planet and Trans-Neptunian object found to possess a ring system. The Saturnian moon Rhea may have a tenuous ring system consisting of three narrow, relatively dense bands within a particulate disk, the first predicted around a moon.

Most rings were thought to be unstable and to dissipate over the course of tens or hundreds of millions of years. Studies of Saturn's rings however indicate that they may date to the early days of the Solar System. Current theories suggest that some ring systems may form in repeating cycles, accreting into natural satellites that break up as soon as they reach the Roche limit. This theory has been used to explain the longevity of Saturn's rings as well the moons of Mars.

Gravitational interactions

Orbital configurations

Cassini's laws describe the motion of satellites within a system with their precessions defined by the Laplace plane. Most satellite systems are found orbiting the ecliptic plane of the primary.  An exception is Earth's moon, which orbits in to the planet's equatorial plane.

When orbiting bodies exert a regular, periodic gravitational influence on each other is known as orbital resonance.  Orbital resonances are present in several satellite systems: 
 2:4 Tethys–Mimas (Saturn's moons)
 1:2 Dione–Enceladus (Saturn's moons)
 3:4 Hyperion–Titan (Saturn's moons)
 1:2:4 Ganymede–Europa–Io (Jupiter's moons)
 1:3:4:5:6 near resonances - Styx, Nix, Kerberos, and Hydra (Pluto's moons) (Styx approximately 5.4% from resonance, Nix approximately 2.7%, Kerberos approximately 0.6%, and Hydra approximately 0.3%).

Other possible orbital interactions include libration and co-orbital configuration. The Saturnian moons Janus and Epimetheus share their orbits, the difference in semi-major axes being less than either's mean diameter. Libration is a perceived oscillating motion of orbiting bodies relative to each other.  The Earth-moon satellite system is known to produce this effect.

Several systems are known to orbit a common centre of mass and are known as binary companions.  The most notable system is the Plutonian system, which is also dwarf planet binary.  Several minor planets also share this configuration, including "true binaries" with near equal mass, such as 90 Antiope and (66063) 1998 RO1.  Some orbital interactions and binary configurations have been found to cause smaller moons to take non-spherical forms and "tumble" chaotically rather than rotate, as in the case of Nix, Hydra (moons of Pluto) and Hyperion (moon of Saturn).

Tidal interaction

Tidal energy including tidal acceleration can have effects on both the primary and satellites. The Moon's tidal forces deform the Earth and hydrosphere, similarly heat generated from tidal friction on the moons of other planets is found to be responsible for their geologically active features. Another extreme example of physical deformity is the massive equatorial ridge of the near-Earth asteroid 66391 Moshup created by the tidal forces of its moon, such deformities may be common among near-Earth asteroids.

Tidal interactions also cause stable orbits to change over time.  For instance, Triton's orbit around Neptune is decaying and 3.6 billion years from now, it is predicted that this will cause Triton to pass within Neptune's Roche limit resulting in either a collision with Neptune's atmosphere or the breakup of Triton, forming a large ring similar to that found around Saturn. A similar process is drawing Phobos closer to Mars, and it is predicted that in 50 million years it will either collide with the planet or break up into a planetary ring. Tidal acceleration, on the other hand, gradually moves the Moon away from Earth, such that it may eventually be released from its gravitational bounding and exit the system.

Perturbation and instability

While tidal forces from the primary are common on satellites, most satellite systems remain stable.  Perturbation between satellites can occur, particularly in the early formation, as the gravity of satellites affect each other, and can result in ejection from the system or collisions between satellites or with the primary.  Simulations show that such interactions cause the orbits of the inner moons of the Uranus system to be chaotic and possibly unstable.  Some of Io's active can be explained by perturbation from Europa's gravity as their orbits resonate. Perturbation has been suggested as a reason that Neptune does not follow the 10,000:1 ratio of mass between the parent planet and collective moons as seen in all other known giant planets. One theory of the Earth-Moon system suggest that a second companion which formed at the same time as the Moon, was perturbed by the Moon early in the system's history, causing it to impact with the Moon.

Atmospheric and magnetic interaction

Some satellite systems have been known to have gas interactions between objects. Notable examples include the Jupiter, Saturn and Pluto systems. The Io plasma torus is a transfer of oxygen and sulfur from the tenuous atmosphere of Jupiter's volcanic moon, Io and other objects including Jupiter and Europa.  A torus of oxygen and hydrogen produced by Saturn's moon, Enceladus forms part of the E ring around Saturn.  Nitrogen gas transfer between Pluto and Charon has also been modelled and is expected to be observable by the New Horizons space probe. Similar tori produced by Saturn's moon Titan (nitrogen) and Neptune's moon Triton (hydrogen) is predicted.

Complex magnetic interactions have been observed in satellite systems.  Most notably, the interaction of Jupiter's strong magnetic field with those of Ganymede and Io.  Observations suggest that such interactions can cause the stripping of atmospheres from moons and the generation of spectacular auroras.

History

The notion of satellite systems pre-dates history.  The Moon was known by the earliest humans.  The earliest models of astronomy were based around celestial bodies (or a "celestial sphere") orbiting the Earth. This idea was known as geocentrism (where the Earth is the centre of the universe).  However the geocentric model did not generally accommodate the possibility of celestial objects orbiting other observed planets, such as Venus or Mars.

Seleucus of Seleucia (b. 190 BCE) made observations which may have included the phenomenon of tides, which he supposedly theorized to be caused by the attraction to the Moon and by the revolution of the Earth around an Earth-Moon 'center of mass'.

As heliocentrism (the doctrine that the Sun is the centre of the universe) began to gain in popularity in the 16th century, the focus shifted to planets and the idea of systems of planetary satellites fell out of general favour.  Nevertheless, in some of these models, the Sun and Moon would have been satellites of the Earth.

Nicholas Copernicus published a model in which the Moon orbited around the Earth in the Dē revolutionibus orbium coelestium (On the Revolutions of the Celestial Spheres), in the year of his death, 1543.

It was not until the discovery of the Galilean moons in either 1609 or 1610 by Galileo, that the first definitive proof was found for celestial bodies orbiting planets.

The first suggestion of a ring system was in 1655, when Christiaan Huygens thought that Saturn was surrounded by rings.

The first probe to explore a satellite system other than Earth was Mariner 7 in 1969, which observed Phobos.  The twin probes Voyager 1 and Voyager 2 were the first to explore the Jovian system in 1979.

Zones and habitability

Based on tidal heating models, scientists have defined zones in satellite systems similarly to those of planetary systems.  One such zone is the circumplanetary habitable zone (or "habitable edge"). According to this theory, moons closer to their planet than the habitable edge cannot support liquid water at their surface. When effects of eclipses as well as constraints from a satellite's orbital stability are included into this concept, one finds that — depending on a moon's orbital eccentricity — there is a minimum mass of roughly 0.2 solar masses for stars to host habitable moons within the stellar HZ.

The magnetic environment of exomoons, which is critically triggered by the intrinsic magnetic field of the host planet, has been identified as another effect on exomoon habitability. Most notably, it was found that moons at distances between about 5 and 20 planetary radii from a giant planet can be habitable from an illumination and tidal heating point of view, but still the planetary magnetosphere would critically influence their habitability.

See also
 Minor-planet moon
 Subsatellite
 Double planet
 Quasi-satellite
 List of extraterrestrial orbiters

Notes

References

Planetary science